Kushtiryakovo (Quştiräk) is a rural locality (a selo) and the administrative centre of Kushtiryakovsky Selsoviet, Bakalinsky District, Bashkortostan, Russia. The population was 345 as of 2010. There are 6 streets.

Geography 
Kushtiryakovo is located 39 km southwest of Bakaly (the district's administrative centre) by road. Kuk-Tyaka is the nearest rural locality.

References 

Rural localities in Bakalinsky District